Meikanda Thevar (c. 11th century CE) was a Hindu poet and expert in Hindu metaphysics and theology.

Personal life
Meikandadevar was born Shvetavana Perumal in the town of Venneinallur situated on the Pennar River.

Works
Meikandadevar was a student of Paranjothi Tampiran. The most popular of his compositions is Sivagnana Bodham, a metaphysical and theological treatise.

References
 

 

Tamil poets
Indian male poets
11th-century Indian poets
Poets from Karnataka
Medieval Tamil poets
Tamil-language writers